Obinitsa Lake (also known as Obinitsa Artificial Lake, Tuhkvitsa Reservoir, Tääglova Reservoir) is a lake in Võru County, on the eastern side of Obinitsa village in Estonia.
The length of the waterline is 4534 metres and surface area of the basin is 43 km². The construction of Obinitsa Artificial Lake on the base of Tuhkvitsa Stream ended in 1995. The beautiful clear-watered lake is suitable for swimming, fishing as well as for boating trips. There is a sandstone outcrop and a cave that has formed because of springs on the left shore of Obinitsa Lake. The cave, associated with many legends, is called Juudatarõ. On the high banks of Obinitsa Artificial Lake stands the monument to the Singing Mother of the Seto People.

References

Lakes of Estonia
Lakes of Võru County
Setomaa Parish